Anissa Khelfaoui (born August 29, 1991) is an Algerian female fencer.

She competed at the 2008 Olympics, finishing in 38th place.

At the 2012 Summer Olympics she competed in the Women's foil, defeated in the first round 4–15.

She also competed at the 2016 Summer Olympics in the Women's foil, defeated in the first round 6–15.

She has competed in several African fencing championships, winning an individual bronze in 2016, along with a team silver that year. She has also won team bronze medals in 2011, 2013, 2014, 2015 and 2017.

References

Algerian female foil fencers
Living people
Olympic fencers of Algeria
Fencers at the 2008 Summer Olympics
Fencers at the 2012 Summer Olympics
Fencers at the 2016 Summer Olympics
Sportspeople from Kyiv
Algerian people of Ukrainian descent
Ukrainian people of Algerian descent
1991 births